Bill Timoney (born March 5, 1958) is an American actor, director, script writer and producer.

Career
Perhaps the best known of Timoney's roles on television is the character of Alfred Vanderpool on All My Children. The musical team Boyz II Men drew inspiration from Timoney's Vanderpool, and Nathan Morris, one of its tenors, used the stage name "Alex Vanderpool" in the character's honor early in the team's career. Timoney portrayed Vanderpool - known as "the preppie nerd of Pine Valley" - from 1982 through 1987, returning to the role on a cameo basis from 1998 through 2005.

Timoney is also a well-known voice actor, specializing in "dubbing" voices for foreign language live action and animated programs.  He has directed and script-adapted dubs of Japanese anime at Headline Studios.

Timoney's eclectic career ranges from working as a stand-up comedian at NYC's famed Improv, to writing the recurring column "Heard But Not Seen: Adventures in Voice Acting" for Videoscope Magazine.

Theatre work
In April 2010, Timoney made his off-Broadway theater debut at the Soho Playhouse as the understudy for the actor Dan Butler in the role of Joseph Flaherty in The Irish Curse, dramatized by Martin Casella. Timoney went on for Butler for several performances. He also went on for Scott Jaeck in the role of Father Kevin for a single performance. In August 2010, Timoney received excellent notices for his performance as Bob in the Stephen Padilla drama, Picking Palin, for the New York International Fringe Festival. Co-starring with Timoney in the play was his wife, actress Georgette Reilly Timoney. The couple have performed together in stage productions at Arkansas Rep, NJ Rep, Shadow Lawn Stage, and the Celtic Theatre Company of New Jersey. The Timoneys voiced the recurring characters of married couple Izzy & Cara on Season 12 of the long-running anime TV series Pokémon.

Timoney served as associate producer, cast member and fight coordinator for the independent feature film Last Chance, the directing debut of Emmy-winning actor Bryan Cranston (of Breaking Bad).

Timoney took a one-year sabbatical from his acting career in 2012 in order to accept an offer to work as the line producer for "Ebru Today," a live, daily morning TV news program. Affiliated with the Turkish Samanyolu media conglomerate, the program aired all over the world. As line producer, Timoney was responsible for constructing each day's script, assigning stories to reporters and editors, and fact-checking the final script. He also wrote commentary and editorials, including the irreverent weekly feature "Get to Know Your Vice-Presidents."

In early 2014, Timoney made his Broadway debut portraying nine roles (Senator Karl Mundt; a White House aide; a butler, a Secret Service agent, a Congressman and others) in a dramatic play written by Robert Schenkkan entitled All The Way starring Bryan Cranston as Lyndon B. Johnson. The play opened on March 6, 2014, at The Neil Simon Theatre in Manhattan. It received very favorable reviews. All The Way won two 2014 Tony Awards for Best Play (Robert Schenkkan) and Best Actor In A Play (Bryan Cranston).

In 2018, Timoney and Cranston returned to Broadway in the stage adaptation of the film Network. Cranston won his second Tony Award for his portrayal of TV news anchorman Howard "mad as hell" Beale. Timoney played the TV news program's director, and he also understudied Cranston in the Beale role.

Timoney appears in the 2019 feature film The Irishman. Director Martin Scorsese chose Timoney to play an unscripted role of the prosecutor at the title character's trial. Timoney and Robert De Niro improvised the entire sequence of the prosecutor questioning the defendant.

Personal life
Timoney has been married to Georgette Reilly, since March 16, 2002. The New Jersey natives reside on the Jersey Shore with their menagerie of dogs and cats.

Filmography

Film
 Addicted to Love - Restaurant Patron
 Dead Canaries - Star Chamber Agent
 Delenda - Cop
 Last Chance - Buddy
 The Irishman - Prosecutor
 The Price for Silence - Dr. Shaw
 The Last Late Night - George Carteris
 Mission to Mars - Computer (voice)
 Rocket's Red Glare - Astronaut Pete Baker
 Sea of Dust - Professor Sorell
 Soccer Dog: The Movie - Kimbell's owner
 The Infiltrator - Binoculars Man (uncredited)
 Wakefield - Homeless Man

Television
 All My Children - Alfred Vanderpool (1982-1987, 1998–2005)
 Billions - farm laborer
 Blue Bloods - Supervisor
FBI - Priest
 Law & Order: Criminal Intent - Henry Forman (Episode: F.P.S.)
 Lipstick Jungle - Marco (Episode: Pilot)
 Malcolm in the Middle - Mr. Miller (Episode: Academic Octathalon)
 Mr. Robot - Male Executive
 Orange is the New Black - Warden Gifford
 Hunters - Congressman Marshall
 The Good Cop - Alley Manager
 The Blacklist - Pastor Ritzen
 The High Life - Frank Stettler (Episode: Army Buddies)
 12 Monkeys - Senator Royce

Anime
 Battle Arena Toshinden - Duke B. Rambert
 Battle Athletes - Additional Voices
 Cowboy Bebop - Baseball Announcer
 Daphne in the Brilliant Blue - Theft Victim
 Digimon Adventure - Lord Bakemon
 Genshiken - Madarame
 Gravitation - Mr. Sakano
 Here is Greenwood - Kazuhiko Hasukawa (CPM dub)
 Ikki Tousen: Dragon Destiny - Ukin
 Jewel BEM Hunter Lime - Mr. Candle
 Legend of Himiko - Enki
 Madara - Chaos
 Mai Mai Miracle - Fujiwara
 Magical Witch Punie-chan - Peter Pilot, Limo Driver
 Queen's Blade - Setora
 Record of Lodoss War - Parn
 Shingu: Secret of the Stellar Wars - Hajime Murata
 Trigun - Kuroneko
 Urotsukidoji: Legend of the Overfiend - Tatsuo Nagumo, Yuichi Nikki
 Voltage Fighters: Gowcaizer the Movie - Ryo Asahina

Animation
 Pup 2 No Good - Veterinarian
 Robot Trains - Vito, Ygor

Video games
 .hack//Infection - Additional voices
 .hack//Mutation - Additional voices
 .hack//Outbreak - Additional voices
 .hack//Quarantine - Additional voices

Production credits

Voice director
 Comic Party
 Genshiken
 Gokudo
 Gravitation
 Jewel BEM Hunter Lime
 Kujibiki Unbalance
 Madara
 Record of Lodoss War (uncredited)

Script adaptation
 Genshiken
 Gokudo
 Gravitation
 Jewel BEM Hunter Lime
 Kujibiki Unbalance
 Madara

References

External links 

1958 births
Living people
American male film actors
American male television actors
American male video game actors
American male voice actors
American voice directors
People from Teaneck, New Jersey